Ted Eshbaugh (February 5, 1906 – July 4, 1969) was an American animation filmmaker who first worked at Van Beuren Studios directing Goofy Goat in 1931. He then formed his own studio, Ted Eshbaugh Studio, in 1932 directing and/or producing such classic shorts as The Snow Man, The Wizard of Oz, The Sunshine Makers, and Sammy Salvage (1943) The studio also produced commercial cartoons commissioned by companies such as Wonder Bakers, making films like Wonder Bakers at the World's Fair and Mr. Peanut and His Family Tree in 1939.

 Goofy Goat Antics (1931)
 The Snow Man (1933)
 The Wizard of Oz (1933)
 Pastry Town Wedding (1934)
 The Sunshine Makers (1935)
 Tea Pot Town (1936)
 Wonder Bakers at the World's Fair (1939)
 Pepsi and Pete's Snowman (1939)
 Mr. Peanut and His Family Tree (1939)
 Sammy Salvage (1943)
 Cap'n Cub (1945)
 Ready Made Magic (1946)
 The White Guard (1947)
 The Pied Piper of Chiclet Town (1948)
 Otto Nobetter and the Railroad Gang (1958)

Early life
Eshbaugh was born in Des Moines, Iowa on February 4, 1906 to Edwin F. and Zada (Kinear) Eshbaugh. Ted's father worked in the farm insurance business and was transferred to Sioux City when Ted was about two years old. The Los Angeles City Directory of 1923 lists Ted as an artist living with his widowed mother.

References

External links 
 

Canadian animated film directors
1906 births
1969 deaths
Van Beuren Studios